René Joder (27 February 1913 – 9 July 2005) was a French water polo player. He competed in the men's tournament at the 1936 Summer Olympics.

References

1913 births
2005 deaths
French male water polo players
Olympic water polo players of France
Water polo players at the 1936 Summer Olympics
Place of birth missing